William Clarke (24 December 1798 – 25 August 1856) was an English cricketer and team manager who played first-class cricket from 1826 to 1855. He founded, managed and captained the All-England Eleven. He has been described as "one of certain figures who, in the history of cricket, stand like milestones along the way". Clarke was born at Nottingham and died at Wandsworth in Surrey.

In the late 1820s, he lost sight in one eye after being struck there by a fives ball on the court behind the Bell Inn in Nottingham.

First-class career
Clarke was originally a bricklayer by trade, but from his earnings as a bowler and an advantageous marriage he was able in 1837 to take up the traditional cricketer's trade of publican. He married Mary Chapman, the landlady of the Trent Bridge Inn, and they arranged for the land behind the inn to be made available. He opened the enclosed Trent Bridge cricket ground behind the inn and, from July 1840, it became the main venue for Nottinghamshire matches instead of the Forest racecourse, which was not enclosed. A stand at Trent Bridge has been named after Clarke.

Clarke was a great spin bowler. He began his first-class career as roundarm bowling was being introduced but he decided to persist with the slow right-arm underarm leg-spin he had learned as a boy. In his career, he took 795 wickets at the outstanding average of 10.06 in 143 known first-class matches with a best analysis of 9/29. He took five wickets in an innings 82 times and ten wickets in a match 26 times. He was a moderate batsman, scoring first-class 2133 runs at an average of 10.35 with a highest score of 75. He took 55 catches.

Clarke played in the inaugural North v. South fixture at Lord's, this being his first appearance there.

He is believed to be the only player ever to take a first-class hat-trick that included the same batsman twice (i.e., John Fagge, the hat-trick spanning both Kent innings).

Captaincy
Besides his bowling, Clarke's greatest attribute was his captaincy and leadership. He was an astute tactician and perhaps the sport's first truly tactical captain who could "think out" the opposition by means of planned field positions and rotation of his bowlers. Taking the reins from Joseph Dennis, Clarke captained the old Nottingham town club from 1830 and automatically succeeded to the captaincy of Nottinghamshire County Cricket Club when it was formed out of the town club in various stages between 1835 and 1840.

The All-England Eleven
In 1845, Clarke had become a ground bowler at Lord's as an MCC employee. Another ground bowler then was William Lillywhite. Clarke had a great season in 1845 and few batsmen could play him well. Although most MCC ground staff were satisfied with their pay, Clarke was not and in 1846 he decided to take matters into his own hands. In August 1846, when the MCC season finished, he formed the All-England Eleven (AEE) as a touring team of leading players to play matches at big city venues, mainly in the "unfashionable but prosperous" North of England. The team played three matches in 1846 against 22 of Sheffield, 18 of Manchester and 18 of Yorkshire. Clarke's team was indeed a top-class side worthy of its title and the matches in Sheffield, Manchester and Leeds were a huge success.

Clarke's touring team continued for several years to showcase the best players of the day and the venture became very profitable, especially for the entrepreneurial Clarke, who was careful to pay his players more than MCC did to keep them interested. He kept the surplus for himself and became very wealthy. John Arlott wrote of him: "He was the first man to make a fortune out of cricket; he was, also, the first to see that a fortune was to be made out of it." Because of its strength, the AEE generally played sides composed of twenty-two men, though these odds were reduced when opposed to such sides as Sheffield, Manchester, some county teams and the rival United All-England Eleven.

References

Cited sources

Further reading
 
 West Norwood Cemetery's Sportsmen, Friends of West Norwood Cemetery, 1995

External links

 
 Notts County Cricket Club – Early Nottinghamshire cricketers

1798 births
1856 deaths
All-England Eleven cricketers
British bricklayers
Burials at West Norwood Cemetery
English cricketers of 1826 to 1863
English cricketers
Kent cricketers
Marylebone Cricket Club cricketers
North v South cricketers
Nottingham Cricket Club cricketers
Nottinghamshire cricket captains
Nottinghamshire cricketers
Cricketers from Nottingham
Players cricketers
Suffolk cricketers
Surrey cricketers
Sussex cricketers
Nicholas Felix's XI cricketers
Fast v Slow cricketers
Players of Nottinghamshire cricketers
Gentlemen of Southwell cricketers
19th-century British businesspeople